The Embassy of Niger in Ankara is the diplomatic mission of the Republic of Niger to the Republic of Turkey.  It is located at 40 Mahatma Gandhi Caddesi, Çankaya, Turkey. It was officially opened in October 2012.

Ambassadors 
 SALOU Adama Gazibo  (2010–present)
 Adam Abdoulaye DAN-MARADI  (2010–2017)

See also 
 List of diplomatic missions of Niger

External links 
 Embassy of Niger in Ankara, official website

Diplomatic missions of Niger
Niger
Niger–Turkey relations